Klinsmann is a German surname. Notable people with the surname include:

 Jonathan Klinsmann (born 1997), American soccer player
 Jürgen Klinsmann (born 1964), German football manager and player

German-language surnames